Magija is the eighth studio album by Serbian recording artist Jelena Karleuša, released on 22 February 2005 under City Records. It contains ten song, mostly covers by other oriental performers, which were recorded between June and December 2004. The record, which features samples from dance, electronic, oriental and Greek laïko music, is generally categorized as pop.

In February 2004, Karleuša participated in the Beovizija music festival with "Moli me" featuring Marcus, placing 11th out of 28 entries.

Magija was promoted with two music videos for the songs "Upravo ostavljena" and "Slatka mala", which were condemned by religious groups and conservatives for the "sacrilegious" use of Christian symbols and for promoting homosexuality by displaying drag queens. The album also features vocals from Saša Matić on the track "Ne smem da se...".

Track listing
Credits adapted from Discogs.

Additional notes
"Slatka mala" contains a sample of "Arabika" (1999) by Hi-Fi.
"Magija" contains a sample of "Emet" (2003) by Ishtar.
"Nisi u pravu" contains a sample of "Poso Mou Leipei" (2002) by Sotis Volanis.
"Upravo ostavljena" contains a sample of "S'Agapo" (2002) by Mariada Pieridi.
"Ide maca oko tebe" contains a sample of "Katse Kala" (2004) by Helena Paparizou.
"Krađa" contains a sample of "El-Alim Allah" (2000) by Amr Diab.
"Sve je dozvoljeno" contains a sample of "Gia Sena" (2002) by Giannis Tassios.

Release history

External links
Magija at Discogs

References

2005 albums
City Records albums
Jelena Karleuša albums